Obesity Surgery is a monthly peer-reviewed medical journal covering bariatric surgery. It was established in 1991 and is published by Springer Science+Business Media. It is the official journal of the International Federation for the Surgery of Obesity and Metabolic Disorders. The editor-in-chief is Scott Shikora (Brigham and Women's Hospital).  According to the Journal Citation Reports, the journal has a 2015 impact factor of 3.346.

References

External links

Obesity journals
Surgery journals
Monthly journals
Publications established in 1991
Springer Science+Business Media academic journals
English-language journals